Mothobi Kharitse (born 29 September 1964) is a Lesotho sprinter. He competed in the men's 100 metres at the 1988 Summer Olympics.

References

1964 births
Living people
Athletes (track and field) at the 1988 Summer Olympics
Lesotho male sprinters
Olympic athletes of Lesotho
Place of birth missing (living people)